Syed Tameem is a cricketer who plays for the Qatar national cricket team. In September 2019, he was named in Qatar's squad for the 2019 Malaysia Cricket World Cup Challenge League A tournament.

References

External links
 

Year of birth missing (living people)
Living people
Qatari cricketers
Pakistani expatriates in Qatar
Place of birth missing (living people)